is a Japanese former figure skater. He is the 1986 Asian Winter Games champion, the 1989 Winter Universiade champion, and a two-time Japanese national champion. He placed 17th at the 1988 Winter Olympics.

Results

References

Figure skaters at the 1988 Winter Olympics
1966 births
Living people
Japanese male single skaters
Olympic figure skaters of Japan
Sportspeople from Osaka Prefecture
Asian Games medalists in figure skating
Figure skaters at the 1986 Asian Winter Games

Medalists at the 1986 Asian Winter Games
Asian Games gold medalists for Japan
Universiade medalists in figure skating
Universiade gold medalists for Japan
Competitors at the 1989 Winter Universiade